Ørnskov is a Danish surname. Notable people with the surname include:

 Flemming Ørnskov (born 1957/58), Danish businessman 
 Martin Ørnskov (born 1985), Danish football player

See also
 Ørskov

Danish-language surnames